Suhani Shah (born 1990) is an Indian mentalist, magician, and YouTuber.

Early life 
Suhani Shah was born in Udaipur, Rajasthan in a Marwadi family. She left her school in class 2 to pursue her passion. She was home-schooled because of her constant tours all over the world. Suhani never had a formal education and says that "Experiences have taught more than what a school could or would".

Career 
Her first stage show was held at Thakorbhai Desai Hall in Ahmedabad on 22 October 1997. She has won several awards and has been conferred the title of Jadoopari by All India Magic Association. As of 2019, she has done more than 5000 shows. She started off as an illusionist and is now a mentalist. She works as a clinical hypnotherapist at her clinic Suhani Mindcare in Goa. She is a corporate trainer, an author and a counsellor too and has given several TED Talks.

Publications

YouTube 
She is active on YouTube, where she uploads videos on topics such as illusionism and mentalism. She also has a web show called That's My Job.

See also 
 List of Indian YouTubers

References
Suhani Shah received award Suhani Shah received award

External links

1990 births
Living people
People from Udaipur
Indian magicians
Mentalists
Indian YouTubers